Garra menoni is a species of ray-finned fish in the genus Garra endemic to the Western Ghats in the Indian state of Kerala.

References 

Garra
Taxa named by Karunakaran Rema Devi
Fish described in 1984